The Gay and Wondrous Life of Caleb Gallo is a 2016 comedy webseries created, written, directed by and starring Brian Jordan Alvarez, who plays Caleb Gallo and executive produced by Justin Berns. The series features actors Stephanie Koenig, Jon Ebeling, Antonio Marziale, Ken Kirby, and Jason Greene. The series ran for 5 episodes on YouTube from 4 Jan 2016 to 2 Sep 2016. The series explores LGBTQ themes, featuring genderfluid and gay characters. The show's style has been described as absurdist and surreal. As Jude Dry of IndieWire describes, "Brian Jordan Alvarez uses the traditional sitcom as a foundation to imagine a world a few marbles short of reality." Steven Horowitz of Paper notes that while the series "may stretch beyond the limits of reality, it's actually deeply rooted in it."

Production 
The Gay and Wondrous Life of Caleb Gallo was funded without a production company, but by an investor. The $10,000 received was split between the first three episodes. Instead of being produced on a schedule, the webseries was made at its own pace. Creator Brian Jordan Alvarez served multiple roles while making the show, including actor, director, producer, writer, and editor. As he explains, "Essentially, I love doing everything myself, so as the production grows, it's a process finding people who I trust to take on parts of the workload that I am no longer capable of doing."

LGBTQ representation 
The Gay and Wondrous Life of Caleb Gallo includes many LGBTQ+ characters and topics, including non-cisgender characters. According to cast member Antonio Marziale, the show's representation is unique in that "It doesn't have to be this big thing". As Jude Dry of IndieWire explains, "Dates are walks, siblings are different races, gender is whatever, and sexual preference is something to be tried on like a fabulous hat".

Cast

Recurring characters 
 Brian Jordan Alvarez as Caleb
 Stephanie Koenig as Karen
 Jon Ebeling as Billy
 Ken Kirby as Lenjamin
 Antonio Marziale as Benicio
 Jason Greene as Freckle

Guests 
 Jimmy Fowlie as Chris (Episode 1.1)
 Michael Strassner as Mike Wake (Episode 1.2, 1.5)
 Judilin Bosita as Jury (advisor) (Episode 1.2, 1.5)
 Punam Patel as Panana (advisor) (Episode 1.2, 1.5)
 Danièle Watts as Tatiana (Episode 1.4, 1.5)
 Curtis Tyrone Scott as Jarius (Episode 1.4)
 Brian Sounalath as Johnny (Episode 1.4)
 Satya Bhabha as Andy (Episode 1.4)
 Toby Abatemarco as Juan (Episode 1.5)
 Loretta Fox as Andrea (Episode 1.5)
 Nick Jandl as Malcolm (Episode 1.5)
 Matthew Lynn as Jeff (Episode 1.5)
 Austin Dale as Cousin Marlon (Episode 1.5)

References 

American LGBT-related web series
2016 web series debuts
2016 web series endings